Atiq-uz-Zaman (born 30 November 1975) is a Pakistani cricket coach and former cricketer. He is a right-handed batsman and a wicketkeeper. He played in one Test match in March 2000. He has played for a number of first-class sides in Pakistan as well as playing club cricket for St Annes Cricket Club in Lancashire, England.

Currently, he is the head coach of the Germany National cricket team

References 

1975 births
Living people
Pakistan One Day International cricketers
Pakistan Test cricketers
Pakistani cricketers
Pakistan Customs cricketers
Karachi Whites cricketers
Karachi cricketers
Karachi Blues cricketers
Habib Bank Limited cricketers
Sui Southern Gas Company cricketers
Khan Research Laboratories cricketers
Cricketers from Karachi
Pakistani cricket coaches
Wicket-keepers